Giuthi is a game played by the Kikuyu of Kenya, amongst others. It belongs to the Mancala family of games and is "played with round counters, such as beans, and two rows of holes in the ground".

References 

Traditional mancala games
Kenyan culture